The Democratic Revival (Greek: Δημοκρατική Αναγέννηση Dimokratiki Anagenissi) is a political party in Greece, initially founded in 2004 by Stelios Papathemelis. It was deactivated after its leader participated in the legislative elections of 2004 with New Democracy and was elected MP.

The party was reactivated in March 2007. In the legislative elections of 2007 the party cooperated with Christian Democracy.

Ideology

According to party literature, Democratic Revival characterizes itself as "democratic, progressive, patriotic, and social". Party leader Papathemelis has defined the party as belonging "politically to the center. Socially, however, as Christians, we surpass all forms of social leftism and progressivism". Papathemelis has stated that Democratic Revival is made up of "groups and cadres which, naturally, come from diverse political positions. With us is Christian Democracy, a movement of the Christian left with history. With us are many cadres from Democratic Social Movement. With us are cadres from PASOK, and cadres from even New Democracy. With us also are cadres from Popular Orthodox Rally who left and recently joined us for reasons they have made public".

In regards to the latter, one such individual included Efthimios Droulias, though he later left Democratic Revival as well.

Electoral results

References

External links
Party's official site
Party's political agenda (in Greek)

Political parties established in 2004
Conservative parties in Greece
Eastern Orthodox political parties
National conservative parties